Horst-Sevenum is a railway station for Horst and Sevenum, The Netherlands. The station was opened on 1 October 1866 and is located on the Venlo–Eindhoven railway. The services are operated by Nederlandse Spoorwegen.

Train service
The following services currently call at Horst-Sevenum:
2x per hour intercity services The Hague - Rotterdam - Breda - Eindhoven - Venlo

Bus services

Bus Service 60 stops at the station. This service serves both Horst and Sevenum.

Taxi Bus services 64 and 65 also stop at this station. 64 to Griendtsveen via America. 65 to Panningen via Evertsoord.

Service 69 also serves the station. Operating between Tienray and Horst-Sevenum station. This service operates via Horst.

External links
NS website 
Dutch Public Transport journey planner 

Railway stations in Limburg (Netherlands)
Railway stations opened in 1866
Railway stations on the Staatslijn E
1866 establishments in the Netherlands
Horst aan de Maas
Railway stations in the Netherlands opened in the 19th century